Marguerite Fourrier was a French tennis player. She competed in the women's singles event at the 1900 Summer Olympics.

References

External links
 

Year of birth missing
Year of death missing
French female tennis players
Olympic tennis players of France
Tennis players at the 1900 Summer Olympics
Place of birth missing
Place of death missing